"Whisper You Love Me Boy" is a song written and composed by Holland–Dozier–Holland and recorded by at least three Motown female acts: early Motown star Mary Wells, popular Motown singing group The Supremes and blue-eyed soul Motown label mate Chris Clark in 1964, 1965 and 1967 respectively.

Song information
The song was first scheduled to be released as a single in 1964 by Mary Wells as the proposed follow-up to Wells' popular "My Guy" (catalogue # M-1056), but the singer was embroiled in a controversial lawsuit with Motown arguing for release from the label. Because of her abrupt exit from Motown in 1965, her version of the single was shelved for release. The song is featured on Wells' final Motown studio album released in 1966, Mary Wells Sings My Guy (catalogue # MT 617/S 617). In 1965 The Supremes recorded it for their popular album, More Hits by The Supremes (catalogue # MT 627/S 627). The song was also placed on the b-side of their number-one hit, "Back In My Arms Again" (catalogue # M-1075). In 1967, Chris Clark recorded the song for her Motown album Soul Sounds (catalogue # M 664/S 664) and in 1968 it was also issued as a single (catalogue # M-1121) on the same label but failed to chart.

Also recorded by Cindy Gibson on Artic Records 104 (Philadelphia) circa 1965/66

Credits

Mary Wells version
Lead vocal by Mary Wells
Background vocals by The Andantes
Instrumentation by The Funk Brothers

The Supremes version
Lead vocal by Diana Ross
Background vocals by Florence Ballard and Mary Wilson
Instrumentation by the Funk Brothers

Chris Clark version
Lead vocal by Chris Clark
Background vocals by The Andantes
Instrumentation by The Funk Brothers

References

1964 songs
1965 singles
1968 singles
Motown singles
Mary Wells songs
The Supremes songs
Songs written by Holland–Dozier–Holland
Song recordings produced by Brian Holland
Song recordings produced by Lamont Dozier